Shahs of Sunset is an American reality television series on Bravo in the United States and on OMNI in Canada. The series debuted on March 11, 2012, and the first season finale was the highest rated episode of the series, at the time, with 1.8 million total viewers. The series follows a group of Iranian American friends living in Beverly Hills (and the greater area known as "Tehrangeles"), who are trying to juggle their active social lives and up-and-coming careers while balancing the demands of their families and traditions. The current cast includes: Reza Farahan, Golnesa "GG" Gharachedaghi, Asa Soltan Rahmati, Mike Shouhed, Mercedes "MJ" Javid, and Shervin Roohparvar.

Series overview

Episodes

Season 1 (2012)

Season 2 (2012–13)

Season 3 (2013–14)

Season 4 (2015)

Season 5 (2016)

Season 6 (2017)

Season 7 (2018)

Season 8 (2020)

Season 9 (2021)

References

External links
 Official website

Lists of American non-fiction television series episodes
Lists of American reality television series episodes